Borda da Mata is a municipality in Minas Gerais, Brazil.

References 

Municipalities in Minas Gerais